This is a list of Scottish football transfers, featuring at least one 2021–22 Scottish Premiership club or one 2021–22 Scottish Championship club, which were completed during the summer 2021 transfer window. The summer window for transfers in Scotland ran from 9 June to 31 August.

List

See also
 List of Scottish football transfers winter 2020–21
 List of Scottish football transfers winter 2021–22

References

Transfers
Scottish
2021 in Scottish sport
2021 summer